Condercum was a Roman fort on the site of the modern-day Condercum Estate in Benwell, a suburb of Newcastle upon Tyne, England. It was the third fort on Hadrian's Wall, after Segedunum (Wallsend) and Pons Aelius (Newcastle), and was situated on a hilltop  to the west of the city.

Today, nothing can be seen of the fort or its adjoining wall, as the site is covered by a modern reservoir and housing estate, bisected by the A186 Newcastle to Carlisle road, which follows the line of Hadrian's Wall. The remains of a small temple dedicated to Antenociticus, a local deity, can be seen nearby, and the original causeway over the vallum, or rear ditch, can also be seen. A modern-day Condercum Road marks the site.

Description

The remains of the fort lie on Hadrian's Wall to the west of Newcastle. The fort contained a commandant's house, headquarters, two granaries, workshops, barracks, stables and a hospital. It was a cavalry fort, and had three gates leading to the north of the wall. There were two side gates, facing east and west, through which the Roman military road, running along the south side of the wall, entered and exited. There was also a south-facing gate that led to a causeway that crossed the vallum. The Vallum was a ditch 20 ft wide and 10 ft deep with the spoil placed in a mound either side of the ditch.

The causeway had a monumental non-military gateway with a large entrance and with some of the best dressed stone on Hadrian's Wall. It was located halfway across the vallum and was closed by doors.

Excavation 

The fort was excavated in the 1920s to 1930s where a dedication table was found that suggested the origin date of 122 AD. Also, pottery was found that dated to the 2nd century indicating the time of the rebuild. Other finds from the site include altars dedicated to the gods, square-head and cruciform brooches, a strong room or treasure vault, and a silver spoon.

In 2017, excavations on a building site in Dorcas Avenue found substantial walls of the vicus.

Excavations in 2020 revealed sections of the fort's foundations in several house gardens.

History

Construction and garrison

It is known from several building inscriptions that the defences of the fort at Benwell were built by soldiers from the Second Augustan Legion (Legio II Augusta). It is believed that it was built between 122 AD and 124 AD. Soldiers from the Twentieth Legion (Legio XX Valeria Victrix) were apparently responsible for some additional building or repair work at Benwell in the late-2nd century.

The Vallum was built shortly after 130 AD to the south of the fort to protect the wall from attack from this side. The vallum could therefore only be crossed at the forts and at Benwell a causeway and a gate provided this access between the Wall and Vallum. At Benwell the gate was about 100 ft south of the fort’s southern gate. The Vallum makes a detour around the fort.

In the 2nd century Condercum was garrisoned by the Cohors I Vangionum Milliaria Equitata, which was a part-mounted unit from Upper Germany. This had a nominal strength of one thousand men, but it is likely that only half of this number occupied the fort. It is thought that from AD 205 to AD 367, a five-hundred-strong auxiliary cavalry unit (Ala I Hispanorum Asturum), from the Astures tribe in northern Spain, was stationed at the fort.

The fort contained two granaries, and it is known that these were built by a detachment from the British Fleet, probably because the legionaries responsible for construction of the fort had been called away. It is likely that the detachment was sent from nearby Arbeia, in modern-day South Shields.

Other buildings

A vicus, or civilian settlement, grew up around the fort, lying to the north and south of the vallum. The remains of several notable buildings were found near the fort indicating that the vicus was extensive.

The remains of a temple dedicated to Antenociticus can still be seen a hundred yards to the east of the fort.
It is believed that the apse contained a life-size statue of the god, as a full size head was found, together with the fragments of an arm and a leg. The head was adorned with a Celtic neck torc.
A number of altar-stones were found, three of which were dedicated to Antenociticus, who is believed to be a Celtic deity. Another dedication to the "three lamiae" may likewise refer to local Celtic deities.

Three hundred yards to the southwest of the fort, a bathhouse was discovered in 1751. The building had several rooms, which were probably the hot and cold rooms and dressing rooms normally found in such bathhouses.

Just south of the vallum causeway, a third building was found. This was a large domestic building, believed to be a mansio, or resthouse for official travellers.

References

J. Collingwood Bruce, Handbook to the Roman Wall (1863), Harold Hill & Son, 
Ronald Pemberton and Frank Graham, Hadrian's Wall in the Days of the Romans (1984), Frank Graham,

External links

CONDERCUM FORT on the line of Hadrian's Wall as it exists today
Benwell (Condercum) Roman Fort
Hadrian's Wall - Condercum ~ Salve ad Condercum ( Benwell )

Forts of Hadrian's Wall
Roman fortifications in England
Former populated places in Northumberland